The Southern Thames Historic District encompasses the commercial and residential area immediately to the south of the colonial center of Newport, Rhode Island. It is characterized by densely built streets, including Thames Street, Newport's major north–south thoroughfare. The district includes the southern portion of Newport's waterfront, extending south from Memorial Boulevard along Thames and Spring Streets to Morton Street, and west to Marchant Street in its southernmost section. The district's housing stock and commercial architecture are largely vernacular wood-frame structures, set close to the sidewalk on small lots. The waterfront area is composed of wharves with warehouses and other structures, many of which have been converted to commercial use. One of the most prominent buildings in the district is the Emmanuel Episcopal Church, designed by Ralph Adams Cram and built in 1912–13.

The district was listed on the National Register of Historic Places in 2008.  The northern portion of the district (from Pope Street north), is also listed as part of the Newport Historic District, a National Historic Landmark District.

See also
National Register of Historic Places listings in Newport County, Rhode Island

References

Colonial architecture in Rhode Island
Federal architecture in Rhode Island
Historic districts in Newport, Rhode Island
Historic districts on the National Register of Historic Places in Rhode Island
National Register of Historic Places in Newport, Rhode Island